The Tower of Caldarellu or the Tower of Figari is a Genoese tower located in the commune of Pianottoli-Caldarello (Corse-du-Sud) on the southwest coast of the Corsica.

The tower was built sometime between 1586 and 1617. It was one of a series of coastal defences built by the Republic of Genoa between 1530 and 1620 to stem the attacks by Barbary pirates. In 1995 the tower was listed as one of the official historical monuments of France.

See also
List of Genoese towers in Corsica

Notes and references

External links
 Includes information on how to reach 90 towers and many photographs.

Towers in Corsica
Monuments historiques of Corsica